Samudravijaya was the father of Lord Neminatha (twenty-second Tirthankara) and brother of Vasudeva (father of Krishna). He was born to King Andhakavrishni of Harivamsa dynasty in Sauripura (Dvaraka) where he later ruled as a king. He married princess Shivadevi.

Literature 
The Harivamsa Purana of Acharya Jinasena throws some light on the life of Samudravijaya.

Notes

References 

Neminatha
Jain monarchs